This is a timeline of Monsanto, a publicly traded American multinational agrochemical and agricultural biotechnology corporation headquartered in Creve Coeur, Greater St. Louis, Missouri.

Big picture

Full timeline

References